Novopokrovsky is a rural locality (a settlement) and the administrative center of Novopokrovskoye Rural Settlement, Novokhopyorsky District, Voronezh Oblast, Russia. The population was 438 as of 2010. There are 6 streets.

Geography 
Novopokrovsky is located 41 km northwest of Novokhopyorsk (the district's administrative centre) by road. Shevlyaginsky is the nearest rural locality.

References 

Populated places in Novokhopyorsky District